Platymaia is a genus of crab in the family Inachidae, containing the following species:
Platymaia alcocki Rathbun, 1918
Platymaia bartschi Rathbun, 1916
Platymaia fimbriata Rathbun, 1916
Platymaia longimana Macpherson, 1984
Platymaia maoria Dell, 1963
Platymaia mindirra Griffin & Tranter, 1986
Platymaia rebierei Guinot & Richer de Forges, 1986
Platymaia remifera Rathbun, 1916
Platymaia turbynei Stebbing, 1902
Platymaia wyvillethomsoni Miers, 1886

References

Majoidea